James Alexander David Tilley (born 13 June 1998) is an English professional footballer who plays as a forward or attacking midfielder for Crawley Town of League Two.

Club career

Brighton & Hove Albion

Tilley made his debut professional appearance for Brighton on 2 May 2015, coming on as a substitute in the 95th minute for Jake Forster-Caskey, in Brighton's last game of the 2014–15 season in which they drew 0–0 away to Middlesbrough. Tilley's second appearance for Brighton came in a 2–4 League Cup victory over Oxford United in the 2016–17 season, with Tilley coming on as a substitute for Elvis Manu in the 87th minute.
Tilley scored his first goal for Brighton in an EFL Cup tie against Barnet on 22 August 2017, where Brighton won 1–0 at Falmer Stadium.

Loan to Cork City

On 18 January 2019, it was confirmed that Tilley had joined League of Ireland club Cork City on a six-month loan. Tilley made his Cork City debut in the President's Cup on 9 February 2019 - Cork City lost 2–1 to Dundalk. On 15 February Tilley made his league debut for Cork City in a 1–0 away defeat against St Patrick's Athletic in the League of Ireland. Tilley scored his first goal for Cork on 1 April in a League Cup match against local side Cobh Ramblers. Opening the scoring in a 4–1 home victory to Cork. Tilley's loan spell ended with Cork sitting only just above the relegation zone.

Loan to Yeovil Town
On 2 September 2019, Tilley signed for National League side Yeovil Town on loan until the end of the season. He made his debut for The Glovers a day later, coming on as a substitute in the 1–0 home win over Sutton.

Grimsby Town
On 15 January 2020, Tilley's loan with Yeovil Town was cut short to sign permanently by Ian Holloway for League Two side Grimsby Town on an initial 18-month contract. Following a managerial change at Grimsby that saw the appointment of Paul Hurst, Tilley was substituted at half time in his Hurst's first game in charge against Cambridge United and the following week he was left out of the squad that travelled to Port Vale, with Hurst saying Tilley's absence had not been down to injury. On 14 January 2021, after a year with the club Tilley left Grimsby after his contract was terminated by mutual consent.

Crawley Town
On 15 January 2021, Tilley joined fellow League Two side Crawley Town on a two-and-a-half-year deal with the option for a further year. 15 days later he made his debut as a half time substitute away at Cambridge United in an eventual 3–1 loss. He scored his first goal for The Red Devils on 20 February on his third appearance scoring a 90+3rd minute winner in a 1–0 home victory over Colchester United.

On 31 August 2021, Tilley joined National League South club Dorking Wanderers on a 28-day loan.

He was sent off after picking up a second yellow for a late challenge on Stephen McLaughlin in Crawley's 2–0 away loss at Mansfield Town on 23 April 2022. He scored three times throughout the season including one on the last game of the season on 7 May, scoring Crawley's first equaliser taking it to 2–2 in the eventual 3–3 draw at already relegated Oldham Athletic.

Personal life
Tilley is part of a footballing family; his father is chairman of Sussex County League club Billingshurst and his eldest brother Nick has also played at County League level.

Career statistics

Honours
Cork City
Munster Senior Cup: 2018–19

References

1998 births
Living people
English footballers
People from Billingshurst
Footballers from West Sussex
Association football forwards
Brighton & Hove Albion F.C. players
Cork City F.C. players
Yeovil Town F.C. players
Grimsby Town F.C. players
Crawley Town F.C. players
Dorking Wanderers F.C. players
English Football League players
League of Ireland players
National League (English football) players